Glen Arthur Bingham (November 2, 1890 – March 13, 1966) was an American football and basketball coach. He served as the head coach at Iowa Wesleyan College from 1926 to 1936, compiling a record of 54–33–7. Bingham was also the head basketball coach at Iowa Wesleyan from 1925 to 1936, tallying a mark of 75–93.

Bingham worked for the Veterans Administration Center in Des Moines, Iowa, before retiring in 1960. He died of leukemia on March 13, 1966, at Iowa Methodist Hospital in Des Moines.

Head coaching record

College football

References

External links
 

1890 births
1966 deaths
Basketball coaches from Kansas
College men's basketball head coaches in the United States
Denver Pioneers football coaches
Denver Pioneers football players
Iowa Wesleyan Tigers athletic directors
Iowa Wesleyan Tigers football coaches
Iowa Wesleyan Tigers men's basketball coaches
Wisconsin Badgers football coaches
High school football coaches in Iowa
People from Sabetha, Kansas
Deaths from leukemia
Deaths from cancer in Iowa